Growing Underground is an urban farming technology company currently located in London, United Kingdom. The company claims itself to the world’s underground urban farm and sells its herbs and salads grown below the 33 meters under the streets of the London. Growing Underground was founded by Richard Ballard and Steven Dring, they partnered with chef Michel Roux Jr. They started the company to produce environmentally friendly, high quality vegetables and herbs.

The company is based in the World War II tunnels, below London's Northern Line underground rail link that was used as a bomb shelter during the World War. The founders claims their herbs to be produced under the hydroponics system and uses significantly less water under a pesticide-free environment.

References

Urban agriculture